TiVi5 Monde, stylized as TiVi5 MONDE, is an international pay television channel launched at the end of January 2012 by the Francophone network TV5 Monde, which is aimed mainly to French-speaking African children (4–13 years). Its main goal is to teach French to young children through dedicated programs.

In the other regions, TiVi5 Monde is a block on TV5 Monde.

History 

The channel was launched in the United States in 2012 exclusively on Dish Network.
On , the channel was launched in Africa, exclusively on Canalsat Horizons, StarSat, and Zuku TV<ref name=":1" /

Programing 
TiVi5 Monde airs educational programs, cartoons, children's series and games. Starting 2016, 12% of the productions broadcast in the channel are African. All the programs are French-speaking; the channel doesn't make any French dubbing of American series. Its programs both playful and educational are broadcast without advertising.

This is a list of the programs formerly or currently broadcast on the channel:

See also 
 Gulli Africa

References

External links 
  (USA)
  (USA)

Television networks in the United States
Television channels in Belgium
Television channels in Flanders
France Télévisions
French-language television networks
French-language television stations
International broadcasters
Mass media in Paris
France Médias Monde
Francophonie